is a Japanese footballer who plays for Giravanz Kitakyushu.

Club statistics
Updated to 23 February 2017.

References

External links

Profile at Giravanz Kitakyushu
Profile at Nagano Parceiro

1991 births
Living people
Kansai University alumni
Association football people from Kagawa Prefecture
Japanese footballers
J2 League players
J3 League players
Giravanz Kitakyushu players
AC Nagano Parceiro players
Association football defenders
Universiade bronze medalists for Japan
Universiade medalists in football
People from Takamatsu, Kagawa
Medalists at the 2013 Summer Universiade